Saotherium is an extinct genus of hippopotamid from the Early Pliocene of Africa, specifically Chad. It is represented by a single species, S. mingoz. The earliest fossils appear at the start of the Pliocene, while the latest are dated to about 4 mya.

Saotherium was a small hippopotamid similar to the pygmy hippopotamus in size and morphology. The elongated shape of its brain case and the relatively large orbits suggest a possible evolutionary relationship with the latter.

References

Hippopotamuses
Prehistoric even-toed ungulate genera
Pliocene mammals of Africa
Pliocene even-toed ungulates
Fossil taxa described in 2005